Paul Dooley (born Paul Brown; February 22, 1928) is an American character actor, writer and comedian. He is known for his roles in Breaking Away, Sixteen Candles, and Popeye.

Early life 
Dooley was born Paul Brown on February 22, 1928, in Parkersburg, West Virginia, the son of Ruth Irene (née Barringer), a homemaker, and Pete James Brown, a factory worker.

He has said that Parkersburg had few attractions that interested him, as there were not many cultural opportunities. He enjoyed listening to comedians on the radio, especially Jimmy Durante.

Dooley was a cartoonist as a youth and drew a strip for a local paper in Parkersburg. In 1946, he joined the United States Navy and served for 2 years before then returning home and graduating from West Virginia University in 1952.

Career 
After graduating from West Virginia University, Dooley went to New York City to try his luck in the entertainment industry. He initially found work as a clown for children's birthday parties.

In New York he soon found success as a regular on the stage. In the early 1950s, he made his debut on the New York stage and was discovered by Mike Nichols. The director gave him his first break by casting him in 1965's The Odd Couple on Broadway. Dooley appeared as Oscar's poker crony, Homer "Speed" Deegan and understudied Art Carney, who portrayed Felix Unger; when Carney left the play later on, Dooley assumed the role of Felix. Dooley was represented by the William Morris Agency, thanks to a referral from Walter Matthau, who played Oscar Madison in the play.

Also having an interest in comedy, Dooley was a stand-up comedian for five years, eventually landing on The Tonight Show, and a member of the Compass Players and The Second City troupe in New York City. Fellow members of The Second City at that time were Alan Arkin and Alan Alda.

Dooley also worked as a writer. He created and was one of the head writers on The Electric Company, produced by the Children's Television Workshop for PBS in the United States. Dooley wrote "runners", a series of short sketches with 8 or 10 characters that were broadcast over the course of several weeks. He found out years later that Carl Reiner had recommended him for the job. Some of the characters Dooley created for The Electric Company included Easy Reader (Morgan Freeman) and Fargo North, Decoder (Skip Hinnant), as well as the soap opera spoof Love of Chair.

Dooley formed a company with Andrew Duncan and Lynne Lipton called All Over Creation to create commercials for radio and television. They produced around 500 TV commercials and 1,000 radio spots. A character named Paul the Gorilla that appeared in television commercials was named after him.

Films 
Dooley has appeared in such films as Sixteen Candles, Popeye, Raggedy Ann and Andy: A Musical Adventure, Breaking Away, and the voice of Sarge in the Disney/Pixar films Cars, Cars 2 and Cars 3.

He worked with Robert Altman regularly and is known as a prolific journeyman character actor. After Altman saw Dooley in the Jules Feiffer comedy Hold Me, he signed him for a role in his film A Wedding.

He and Altman co-wrote the film Health. 

He was also in the director's cut of Little Shop of Horrors, but was replaced by Jim Belushi in the final cut.

Dooley has worked with Christopher Guest on a number of films.

Television 
Dooley has also appeared as a variety of recurrent characters on numerous television shows, including My So-Called Life, Dream On, Grace Under Fire, thirtysomething, Curb Your Enthusiasm, ALF (playing Whizzer Deaver), Chicago Hope, and Star Trek: Deep Space Nine where he played the recurring role of Enabran Tain. He guest starred in other primetime shows like Bewitched, The Wonder Years, Sabrina, the Teenage Witch, The Golden Girls, Hot in Cleveland, and Desperate Housewives. Dooley starred in the short-lived comedy about a couple living in an Arizona retirement community, Coming of Age, opposite veteran actors Phyllis Newman, Glynis Johns and Alan Young. In 2000, he was nominated for an Emmy Award for his role as an eccentric judge on The Practice.

In 2010, Dooley played the part of the head chef at Camp Victory, a fictional fat camp, on the short-lived ABC Family original series Huge, which was created and written by his wife and daughter.

In 2014 he appeared in an episode of the NBC series Parenthood as Rocky, a fellow vet and retiree to Craig T. Nelson's Zeek Braverman.

In 2017 he appeared in the episode "22 Steps" of the ABC series The Good Doctor as Glenn, a 72-year-old man with a failing heart who breaks his pacemaker because he wants to die due to the constant pain he is suffering.

Theater 
Dooley co-wrote the play, Assisted Living, with his wife Winnie Holzman. It was their first theatrical collaboration. The play premiered on April 5, 2013.

Personal life 
Dooley has been married to Winnie Holzman, whom he first met at an improv acting class in New York, since November 18, 1984. The couple have a daughter Savannah and live in Toluca Lake in Los Angeles.

He was previously married to Donna Lee Wasser on September 19, 1958, which ended in divorce. He has three children from his first marriage.

Filmography

Film

Television

Video games

Theme park attractions

References

External links 

 

1928 births
20th-century American male actors
21st-century American male actors
Living people
American male stage actors
American male film actors
American male voice actors
American male television actors
Male actors from West Virginia
People from Parkersburg, West Virginia
People from Toluca Lake, Los Angeles